This is a list of economic booms created by commodities.

References